DeMarco or Demarco is a name, originally meaning (son) of Marco.

As a surname

Ab DeMarco, Canadian ice hockey player
Ab DeMarco Jr., American ice hockey player and Ab DeMarco's son
Antonio DeMarco, Mexican boxer
Bert Demarco, Scottish snooker player
Bob DeMarco, American football player (active 1961–75)
Brian DeMarco, American football player (active 1995–99)
Edward DeMarco acting director of the Federal Housing Finance Agency (FHFA)
Hugo Demarco, Argentine-French painter
Laura DeMarco, mathematician
Mac DeMarco, Canadian musician
Richard Demarco CBE, Scottish artist
Tom DeMarco, American software engineer and author
Tony DeMarco, American boxer
Tony DeMarco (dancer), American vaudeville dancer
Vincent DeMarco, advocate for public health causes

As a given name
Demarco (musician), stage name of Collin Edwards, Jamaican reggae artist
DeMarcco Hellams (born 2000), American football player
DeMarco Johnson (born 1975), American basketball coach and former professional basketball player
DeMarco Morgan, American journalist
DeMarco Murray (born 1988), American football coach and former professional football player
DeMarco Sampson (born 1985), American football coach and former professional football player

Fictional characters
John R. DeMarco, main character in Don Juan DeMarco, 1995 film starring Johnny Depp
Galen DeMarco in the Judge Dredd universe
 Reese DeMarco, character in Kay Hooper's Special Crimes Unit novels

See also
DiMarco, variant form of Italian origin
Patronymic surnames
Surnames from given names